Moisés Hernández Encarnación (born 22 March 1993) is a Dominican Republic taekwondo athlete.

He represented his country at the 2016 Summer Olympics in Rio de Janeiro, in the men's 80 kg.

He represented the Dominican Republic at the 2020 Summer Olympics.

References

External links

1993 births
Living people
Dominican Republic male taekwondo practitioners
Olympic taekwondo practitioners of the Dominican Republic
Taekwondo practitioners at the 2016 Summer Olympics
Pan American Games medalists in taekwondo
Pan American Games silver medalists for the Dominican Republic
Taekwondo practitioners at the 2015 Pan American Games
Taekwondo practitioners at the 2019 Pan American Games
Medalists at the 2015 Pan American Games
Medalists at the 2019 Pan American Games
Taekwondo practitioners at the 2020 Summer Olympics
21st-century Dominican Republic people